The Avenger Air Defense System, designated AN/TWQ-1 under the Joint Electronics Type Designation System, is an American self-propelled surface-to-air missile system which provides mobile, short-range air defense protection for ground units against cruise missiles, unmanned aerial vehicles, low-flying fixed-wing aircraft, and helicopters.

The Avenger was originally developed for the United States Armed Forces and is currently used by the U.S. Army. The Avenger system was also used by the U.S. Marine Corps.

History
Originally developed as a private venture by Boeing in the 1980s, the Avenger was developed over a period of only 10 months from initial concept to delivery for testing to the U.S. Army. Initial testing was conducted in May 1984 at the Army's Yakima Training Center in the U.S. state of Washington. During testing three FIM-92 Stinger missiles were fired.

The second test firing, conducted at night while stationary, also achieved a direct hit. The third test firing, conducted while on the move and in the rain, did not achieve a direct hit, but did pass within the missile's kill range, so the shot was scored as a tactical kill. All three test shots were conducted by operators who had never fired the missile before.

In 1987, the U.S. Army awarded the first production contract for 325 units. In 1989, the system began its Initial Operational Test and Evaluation (IOT&E) series of tests. The tests were conducted in two stages with Stage 1 consisting of acquisition and tracking trials at Fort Hunter Liggett, California, and Stage 2 consisting of live-fire testing at White Sands Missile Range, New Mexico. In February 1990, the Avenger system was deemed operationally effective and began replacing the M163 and M167 VADS. Two variants were deployed based on the Humvee chassis: M998 HMMWV Avenger and M1097 Heavy HMMWV Avenger.

The first operational deployment of the system occurred during the buildup for the Persian Gulf War. With the success of this deployment, the U.S. Army signed an additional contract for another 679 vehicles, bringing the total order to 1,004 units. The Avenger was again successfully deployed in support of NATO operations during the Bosnian War. The Avenger system received widespread public exposure when it was placed around the Pentagon during the first anniversary of the September 11 attacks of 2001. The Avenger was also deployed during the U.S. military's operations in Afghanistan and Iraq.

In 2004, the U.S. Army had 26 battalions with Avenger Short-Range Air Defense (SHORAD) capabilities, but prioritization of other weapon systems during operations in Afghanistan and Iraq caused that number to drop to nine by early 2017, of which two were within the active force and seven were in the Army National Guard. Of the over 1,100 Avengers built, only about 400 remain in service. In March 2018, in response to renewed Russian aggression since the 2014 annexation of Crimea, the 678th Air Defense Artillery Brigade deployed to Europe, the first time an American air defense unit had been sent there since the Cold War. The Army plans to deploy 72 Avenger sets to support U.S. European Command.

During protests regarding the Dakota Access Pipeline near Standing Rock, the North Dakota National Guard deployed an Avenger system as an observation platform. It was employed for over a month  to observe areas within Morton County where numerous instances of criminal trespass and mischief had occurred. The unarmed Avenger was used to support public safety in southern Morton County. The Avenger system was removed in order to deescalate any tensions its presence may have caused.

In April 2017, an Avenger fired Stingers at two UAVs in a test on Eglin Air Force Base, marking the missile's first interception of a UAV target. While Stingers are usually loaded with direct impact warheads for use against aircraft and cruise missiles, these were equipped with proximity fuzes that enabled them to detonate near the target, giving them the ability to destroy small UAVs. Since small UAVs do not produce large heat signatures, the Avenger uses a laser rangefinder in combination with an antenna on the warhead to direct the missile on target.

On 30 September 2020, the U.S. Army awarded General Dynamics a contract to deliver the Interim Maneuver SHORAD (IM-SHORAD), a Stryker armored vehicle fitted with heavier weapons to replace the outdated, unarmored, and undergunned Avenger Humvee.

In November 2022, four Avenger air defense systems were included as part of a $400 million military aid package supporting Ukraine during the 2022 Russian invasion of Ukraine to defend critical civilian infrastructure against cruise missile and Iranian-made Shahed-136 lethal drone attacks. Another eight were included in a package in January 2023.

Overview

The Avenger comes mainly in three configurations, the Basic, Slew-to-Cue, and the Up-Gun.

The Basic configuration consists of a gyro-stabilized air defense turret mounted on a modified heavy Humvee. The turret has two Stinger missile launcher pods, each capable of firing up to 4 fire-and-forget infrared/ultraviolet guided missiles in rapid succession. The Avenger can be linked to the Forward Area Air Defense Command, Control, Communications and Intelligence (FAAD C3I) system, which permits external radar tracks and messages to be passed to the fire unit to alert and cue the gunner.

The Slew-to-Cue (STC) subsystem allows the commander or gunner to select a FAAD C3I reported target for engagement from a display on a Targeting Console developed from VT Miltope's Pony PCU. Once the target has been selected, the turret can be automatically slewed directly to the target with limited interaction by the gunner.

The Up-Gun Avenger was developed specifically for the 3rd Armored Cavalry Regiment for the Regiment's 2005 deployment to Iraq. The modification was designed to allow the Avenger to perform unit and asset defense in addition to its air defense mission. The right missile pod was removed and the M3P 12.7 mm (.50) cal machine gun was moved to the pod's former position. This allowed for the removal of the turret's cab safety limits which enabled the gun to be fired directly in front of the HMMWV. Eight of the unit's Avengers were modified to this configuration. With the 3rd ACR's redeployment from Iraq, the Up-Gun Avenger completed its role in Operation Iraqi Freedom and the Avengers have been scheduled to be converted back to STC systems.

Variants

Boeing/Shorts Starstreak Avenger

Boeing teamed with Shorts Brothers PLC (now part of Thales) to offer an Avenger system in which one Stinger pod was replaced with a pod of four Starstreak Hyper-velocity laser-guided missiles, in the hopes of attracting a U.S. Army contract under the Forward Area Air Defense System Line-of-Sight Rear (FAADS-LOS-R) program. Test installation was carried out in mid-1990 and firing trials followed from mid-1991 in the U.K. Starstreak would have complemented the Stinger by improving the overall systems ability to deal with low hovering helicopters which frequently do not provide enough contrast for lock-on by infrared guided missiles.  Starstreak also has the ability to be used against un-armored and lightly armored ground vehicles.

Boeing/Matra Guardian
In the 1990s Boeing teamed with Matra of France to offer the Avenger modified by the substitution of standard triple launcher boxes for Matra Mistral missiles in place of the quadruple Stinger pods of the standard Avenger. One demonstrator vehicle was built in 1992 and test firings took place in France.  The project was dropped around 1997.

Avengers during the Iraq War
Due to the lack of serious airborne threats  during much of the Iraq War, along with the pressing need for ground assets for combat roles such as convoy protection, the Avenger was pressed into this role. The FLIR/laser rangefinder combined with the 12.7 mm (.50) cal machine gun has proved to be very effective, but was limited by no-fire zones, particularly to the front of the vehicle. A program was instituted to remove one of the missile pods and move the machine gun to that position to enable a 360° field of fire. The upgrade also increased the ammunition capacity to 650 rounds.

Avenger DEW
Another potential variant proposed by Boeing is an Avenger with a Directed Energy Weapon (DEW).  Boeing completed an initial test of a 1 kW laser mounted where the right missile pod would be.  The M3P 12.7 mm (.50) cal has been replaced by the M242 Bushmaster as its close defense weapon.

Avenger Multi-Role Weapon System
Test firing demonstrations of this variant took place in 2004. It is modified by re-locating the M3P machine gun over the turret cab to allow a 360-degree field of fire, increasing ready-use machine gun ammunition stowage to 600 rounds, and providing the option to substitute launchers for 2 FGM-148 Javelin missiles in place of 1 Stinger pod.

Accelerated Improved Interceptor Initiative (AI3)
In February 2012, Raytheon was awarded a contract to develop the AI3, a modified AIM-9 Sidewinder missile mounted on the Avenger launcher, to perform counter rocket, artillery, mortar (C-RAM), counter unmanned aerial vehicle (C-UAV), and counter cruise missile duties.

In 2013, the US Army decided to not buy the system.

In August 2014, the system successfully intercepted a UAV and cruise missile target featuring a semi-active radar homing seeker in a test.

Other variants
Boeing have proposed that the Avenger PMS turret could be mounted on other vehicles such as Unimog truck, BV-206 all-terrain vehicles, M113 APC, and M548 tracked cargo carrier as well as being used as a stationary ground mount on a pallet for defense of static targets. The Avenger PMS has been demonstrated with a mock-up of two 70 mm helicopter-type rocket pods carrying a total of 36 rockets to give the system greater multi-mission utility.  Other missiles such as the Bofors RBS 70/Bolide have been proposed for use on the Avenger PMS.

In March 2017, Boeing revealed a modernized Avenger system fitted with AIM-9X Sidewinder and Longbow Hellfire missiles on the sides and a directed energy weapon affixed to the top.  It is also planned to be integrated onto other platforms including the JLTV, Stryker, and Bradley Fighting Vehicle. While Boeing had configured a Stryker with the Avenger turret to fulfill the Army's Interim Maneuver-Short-Range Air Defense (IM-SHORAD) requirement, the Army ultimately decided against the idea, feeling it would require major modifications to the vehicle and because of the company's desire for the service to supply the turrets, of which there were a limited amount existing readily in the inventory.

During a 2017 joint French-Egyptian naval exercise, an AN/TWQ-1 Avenger was mounted onto the helicopter flight deck of a Mistral-class amphibious assault ship to provide ad-hoc close-range air defense. The ship was originally slated to be sold to Russia, but the sale was canceled due to international sanctions imposed on Russia following the Annexation of Crimea. The ship was sold to the Egyptian navy without the originally planned Russian air defense systems.

Specifications

Dimensions
 Length  
 Width  
 Height  
 Weight  
 Crew – 2 (Basic), 3 (STC)
 Road speed  
 Range  
 Engine  Detroit Diesel cooled V-8
 Engine power output

Sensors
 Forward Looking Infrared Receiver (FLIR)
 Eye Safe Laser rangefinder
 Optical sight

Weapons
 4/8 ready-to-fire FIM-92 Stinger missiles
 One FN M3P machine gun built by FN Herstal, a variant of the Browning AN/M3 developed for aviation use during World War II. It is a 12.7 mm (.50) caliber machine gun with an electronic trigger that can be fired from both the remote control unit (RCU) located in the drivers cab, and from the handstation located in the Avenger turret. It has a 950 to 1100 rounds per minute firing rate. Loads one box of 200250 rounds at a time.

Operators

  
  

 

  – LAF Air Defence Battalion

  - Avenger batteries have been upgraded by integrating CS/MPQ-90 Bee Eye radars 
  – U.S. Army and U.S. Marine Corps
  - 12 systems to be delivered from U.S. inventory, with 4 announced in 2022, and 8 announced in 2023.

See also
 Anti-aircraft warfare
 Atılgan PMADS
 FIM-92 Stinger
 Joint Electronics Type Designation System
 United States Army Aviation and Missile Command

Comparable systems
 Type 92 Yitian
 Type 93 Surface-to-air missile
 9K35 Strela-10 (SA-13 Gopher)
 9K31 Strela-1 (SA-9 Gaskin)

References

External links

 U.S. Army Technology Avenger Project Details
 U.S. Army Fact File
 Army Recognition article
http://www.wearethemighty.com/articles/egypt-pulls-a-perfect-macgyver-move-to-defend-its-ships-from-air-attack

Missile defense
Military electronics of the United States
Military vehicles introduced in the 1980s
Self-propelled anti-aircraft weapons of the United States
Self-propelled anti-aircraft weapons
Surface-to-air missiles of the United States